Kainoor Shiva Temple  is located at Kainoor village in Thrissur district. The temple preceding deity is Shiva in the sanctum sanctorum facing east. It is believed that this temple is one of the 108 Shiva temples of Kerala and is installed by sage Parasurama dedicated to Shiva. Maha Shivarathri festival of the temple celebrates in the Malayalam month of Kumbha (February - March). In ancient days Murajapam was conducting daily in Kainoor Shiva Temple. On the east, there is an imposing gopuram (tower) and it's recently built. The temple is located in center of Kainoor grama (village), on the Thrissur - Manamangalam - Puthur route, on the bank of Manali river, a tributary of Karuvannur puzha.

See also
 108 Shiva Temples
 Temples of Kerala

References

108 Shiva Temples
Shiva temples in Kerala
Hindu temples in Thrissur district